Patrick H. Moriarty (born 27 February 1939) is a British character actor and voice actor, known for his role as 'Razors' in John Mackenzie's The Long Good Friday.

Career
Moriarty came to acting late in life; he had worked as a boxer and a docker previously. He began acting when he was discovered by a film crew shooting a scene on the English docks. As well as being known for his role as 'Razors' in John Mackenzie's The Long Good Friday (1980), he also portrayed 'Hatchet Harry' in Guy Ritchie's Lock, Stock and Two Smoking Barrels (1998) and Gurney Halleck in the Sci Fi Channel's 2000 miniseries Frank Herbert's Dune and its 2003 sequel, Frank Herbert's Children of Dune.

Personal life

Filmography

References

External links

 P. H. Moriarty at BFI

1939 births
English people of Irish descent
English male film actors
Living people
Male actors from London